Ju Kwang-Youn(born May 13, 1985) is a South Korean footballer. He previous played for Chunnam Dragons and Sangju Sangmu Phoenix.

He was arrested on the charge connected with the match fixing allegations on 7 July 2011.

Club career statistics

References

External links
 

1982 births
Living people
Association football forwards
South Korean footballers
Jeonnam Dragons players
Gimcheon Sangmu FC players
K League 1 players